Belair is an unincorporated community in Leon County, Florida, United States.

Notes

Unincorporated communities in Leon County, Florida
Unincorporated communities in Florida